Cruzeiro do Sul is the largest newspaper in Sorocaba city, São Paulo, Brazil. It was founded on June 12, 1903, by brothers Firmino Joaquim Pires de Camargo (Nho Quim Pires) and João Clímaco Pires de Camargo. The publication began distributing the same year, initially four pages, with a bi-weekly circulation. It is owned and sponsored by the Ubaldino do Amaral Foundation-FUA.

History 
In the beginning, the objectives of the newspaper were political, voicing strong opposition to the Republican Party PRP and their local leaders. On the night of October 30, 1903 there was an attempted arson and jamming of the paper. In 1936, the newspaper changed ownership and was purchased by Ignacio da Silva Rocha, Carlos Correia, who promoted improvements. In 1940, Orlando da Silva Freitas, director of Radio Clube de Sorocaba, bought the newspaper and start a through process to modernize the design and graphics.

In 1963, a group of 21 members of the Masonic Lodge Perseverance III acquired the Cruzeiro do Sul editor, beginning a process of modernization, and turning it into a non-profit. Since the time of foundation the paper has become a major media complex in São Paulo.

Market Position
After almost a century, the "Cruzeiro do Sul" now occupies a unique position among Brazilian newspapers, whose market consists of 283 newspapers. In the 625 municipalities of São Paulo State, only 52 - just over 8% of the total - have a daily newspaper. Of these, most are not daily in the full sense of the word, circulating six days a week. The Cruzeiro do Sul circulates every day, from Monday to Sunday, and is audited by CVI (National Movement Tester). Its circulation is surpassed only by the Correio Popular on Sunday from Campinas.

Editorials
 Brazil
 Economy
 Sport
 Exterior
 Facts & Opinions
 Computers
 Mais Cruzeiro
 Police
 Policy
 Region
 Sorocaba

Channels
 Farming
 Sunday Notebook
 Home & Finishing
 Science & Technology
 Classifieds
 Cruzeirinho
 CruzeiroCard
 Education
 She
 Special
 Young People
 Motor
 More TV
 Presence
 Promotions
 Memory Project

Magazine
 Health
 Tourism

Columns
 Retired
 Article
 Channel Zaap
 Celso Ming
 Cinemas
 Cruise-Eye
 Consumer Protection
 Reader
 Dora Kramer
 Editorial
 Markets Today
 TV Movies
 End of Game
 Phrases
 Generate Kindness Kindness
 100 years
 Horoscope
 Free Information
 Economic Indicators
 Lotteries
 Luis Nassif
 More Flavors
 Necrology
 Sports Opinion
 Panel
 Think Well
 Ask the INSS
 X-Ray
 Laughter Galera
 Screenplay TV
 Frog in water
 Segundão of Marvadão
 Time
 Touch of Light

Surcursals
 Central Sorocaba
 Sorocaba Shopping Center
 Votorantim
 São Paulo

References

External links 
 Site of the Journal
 João Clímaco de Camargo Pires - Founder

List of newspapers in Brazil

Sorocaba
Newspapers